The Sierra Pinta or Sierra Pintas (colloquial Spanish for 'Painted Mountains') are a narrow remote block faulted northwest-southeast trending mountain range, about  long located in southwestern Arizona in the arid northwestern Sonoran Desert, just north of the Pinacate Reserve of northern Sonora, Mexico.  The mountains derive their name from visitor descriptions of its multicolored hues when viewed at sunrise and sunset.

The Sierra Pinta range is toward the southern end of the Mohawk Valley, which also borders the range on the east, and east to the Bryan Mountains. West of the Sierra Pintas is the Tule Desert, and south in northern Sonora is the El Pinacate y Gran Desierto de Altar, the extensive and active volcanic and cinder cone field and preserve.

An early noting of the existence of the Sierra Pinta Range was in the explorations of Anza.

Roads and the region 
West of the northwest end of the Sierra Pintas, the north–south "Christmas Pass Road" goes south from Interstate 8 and through Christmas Pass, adjacent to the Tule Desert, on the southeast end of the Cabeza Prieta Mountains (all to the southwest of the Sierra Pintas). The road terminates close by at the US-Mexico Border at an unimproved road called the El Camino del Diablo, or Devil's Highway, which parallels the border. This is a no man's land region in the high point of summer heat.

Ecology 
The Sierra Pintas lie in the central-western portion of the Cabeza Prieta National Wildlife Refuge. The closest access point from the north is Mohawk on Interstate 8 in Arizona, through the Barry M. Goldwater Air Force Range. Ajo, Arizona is 35 air miles eastward beyond two mountain ranges and valleys; Sonoyta, Sonora is slightly southeastward at the south border crossing of the Organ Pipe Cactus National Monument.

The Sierra Pinta Range is a demarcation line of distribution for occurrence of a number of species. For example, this range is the southernmost occurrence of the California Fan Palm, Washingtonia filifera.

See also 
 Valley and range sequence-Southern Yuma County
 List of mountain ranges of Yuma County, Arizona
 List of mountain ranges of Arizona

References 
 C. Michael Hogan. 2009. California Fan Palm: Washingtonia filifera, GlobalTwitcher.com, ed. Nicklas Stromberg
 Herbert Eugene Bolton, Francisco Palóu, José Joaguín Moraga, Juan Díaz, Pedro Font, Francisco Tomás Hermenegildo Garcés, Tomás Eixarch. 1966. Anza's California expeditions, Published by Russell and Russell

Line notes 

Mountain ranges of the Sonoran Desert
Mountain ranges of Yuma County, Arizona
Mountain ranges of Arizona